Maximilian Johannes Haas (born 7 December 1985) is a German former professional footballer who played as a centre-back or a defensive midfielder.

Career

Early years and Bayern
Born in Freising, Bavaria, Haas played four years in the Landesliga with hometown's SE Freising, before joining Bayern Munich II in July 2007. He did not make his debut until 29 October of the following year, when he came on as a 59th-minute substitute for Mehmet Ekici in a 3–3 away draw against SV Sandhausen, but soon became a regular in the team, initially in midfield but subsequently in defence; he scored his first goal for the reserves on 14 February 2009, in a 3–2 loss at Dynamo Dresden.

In 2010, Haas was picked by Bayern Munich manager Louis van Gaal for the main squad, but continued to play mainly for the B-side. He appeared in pre-season friendlies with the former, most notably the Franz Beckenbauer farewell match against Real Madrid, but, not being involved in any competitive games, moved to England on 31 January 2011 and signed for Football League Championship club Middlesbrough for an undisclosed fee.

Middlesbrough
Haas made his debut for Boro against Queens Park Rangers, playing the last eight minutes in a 3–0 home defeat. He made his first full start in a 4–2 victory at Hull City, on 23 April 2011.

At the end of the season, Haas was released.

Portugal
In January 2012, Haas had a trial at Karlsruher SC, but nothing came of it. At the end of the month he moved to Portugal and joined U.D. Leiria, signing until 30 June 2014.

On 12 February 2012, Haas made his official debut for his new team, playing the full 90 minutes in a 4–0 away loss to Porto. He was used regularly until the end of the campaign, but eventually terminated his contract alongside several other players due to lack of payments, as the side ranked 16th and last in the Primeira Liga.

On 26 June 2012, Haas signed with S.C. Braga for three years. He played his first league match the following 6 January, playing the entire 1–0 home win against Moreirense; his competitive debut had taken place on 16 November, in the 3–1 success at Pampilhosa for the season's Taça de Portugal.

Haas scored his first and only goal for the Minho side on 2 January 2013, helping to a 2–1 away win over Associação Naval 1º de Maio for the Taça da Liga.

Honours
Bayern Munich
DFL-Supercup: 2010

Braga
Taça da Liga: 2012–13

References

External links

1985 births
Living people
People from Freising
Sportspeople from Upper Bavaria
German footballers
Footballers from Bavaria
Association football defenders
Association football midfielders
Association football utility players
3. Liga players
FC Bayern Munich II players
FC Bayern Munich footballers
English Football League players
Middlesbrough F.C. players
Primeira Liga players
U.D. Leiria players
S.C. Braga players
German expatriate footballers
German expatriate sportspeople in England
Expatriate footballers in England
German expatriate sportspeople in Portugal
Expatriate footballers in Portugal